From Nazi Germany's invasion of Poland in 1939, the Wehrmacht recruited from Poland's 2.2% ethnic German minority, while it did not enlist ethnic Poles on racist grounds. When Germany began losing the war 1943, the Wehrmacht forcibly conscripted ethnic Poles, who were commanded with racist policies against them. 

Nazi Germany defined Poland's ethnic German minority as racially superior Volksdeutche and ethnic Poles as subhuman. In addition to murdering 3 million Polish Jews in the Shoah, Germany carried out genocide against the ethnic Poles; at least 1.9 million were murdered, especially those in influential and leadership roles, while the rest were exploited for their labour, including in the military. 

The Wehrmacht High Command did not trust the ethnic Poles under their command, who when taken prisoner-of-war by the Allies had a tendency to sign up with the Polish Army in exile. Nearly 90,000 Poles forcibly conscripted into the Wehrmacht then fought against Nazi Germany in the Polish Armed Forces in the West. By Victory Day in 1945, nearly a third of the Polish soldiers in the West had formerly served in the German military. On the Eastern Front, prisoner-of-war camps for Wehrmacht soldiers were a substantial recruitment pool for the Polish Armed Forces in the East.

The term "grandfather in the Wehrmacht" became a slur in Poland. Having served in the German military or being a descendant of such individuals has led in Poland to repression, discrimination, and ostracization. Even in the 21st century, such people are often seen as not being an integral part the Polish national community.

Estimates
Some Polish citizens of diverse ethnicities served in the Wehrmacht and the Waffen-SS, in particular in parts of Poland annexed by Germany such as Upper Silesia and Pomerania. Service in the German military was universal in nature in these areas, however, assessing the number of ethnic Poles involved is difficult due to the fluidity of national identity. At the low end, Polish estimates often place the number of native Poles at 250,000. Ryszard Kaczmarek of the University of Silesia in Katowice produced a conservative estimate of at least 295,000 based on documentary evidence; however, he considers this very low and is inclined to assume category III Volksliste were mobilized as much as males in the Old Reich, which leads to a maximum estimate of 500,000. Early 1944 estimates by the Polish underground are similar, at 400,000-450,000 Poles from Reichsgau Danzig-West Prussia and Silesia.

German authorities assumed those classified as category III Volksliste were in fact mostly ethnically Polish, and marked their military documents with "Pole".

Motivation
Various factors contributed to Poles serving in the Wehrmacht. From the Nazi perspective, racial theory saw Kashubians and Silesians as Volksgemeinschaft. Serving in the Wehrmacht was not motivated solely by a desire for collaboration, but often resulted from the need to adapt to a complex and changing situation, and in some cases was done for opportunistic reasons. In 1943-1945, German losses at the front led to liberalization of the Nazi racial rules and mass recruitment of Poles.

In the annexed areas, registration as Volksliste was not only encouraged by the German authorities, but also by the Polish Underground State and Catholic Church who wanted to preserve the Polish character of these lands by preventing mass deportation of their inhabitants. Thus, in the Katowice district, 1.4 million people registered in the Volksliste. The number of residents who refused registration was relatively negligible.

There was also a German storm brigade known as the Volksdeutscher Selbstschutz formed by the German minority in Poland. Many of its members were trained in the Third Reich. As soon as the war started, the Selbstschutz engaged in widespread massacres of Poles and Jews in West Prussia, Upper Silesia and Reichsgau Wartheland, together with the Einsatzgruppen.

Polish Armed Forces
On the Western Front, Polish prisoners were first encountered by the allies in prisoner-of-war camp for Afrika Korps soldiers. After realizing that a high number of prisoners were Polish, the British and the Polish Armed Forces in the West created a special section aimed at recruiting POWs to serve the allied cause. Recruitment efforts intensified in the summer of 1943.

In January 1944, after Henry Maitland Wilson expressed concern over the lack of Polish replacement troops, General Władysław Anders assured him replacements would be recruited at the front lines. In the Polish II Corps, there were 2,500 ex-POWs by June 1944, a number which rose to 18,500 by 1945. Anders' optimism was well-founded, and thanks to POW recruitment the Polish army in the West ended the war as a larger formation than it had started as when the Italian campaign began. Aside from recruits from the Wehrmacht, the Anders Army also absorbed 176 former soldiers from the 14th Waffen Grenadier Division of the SS (1st Galician).

Ultimately, nearly 90,000 Poles formerly employed by the Wehrmacht served in the Polish Armed Forces in the West. By Victory Day in 1945, nearly a third of Polish soldiers in the West had formerly served in the German military.

On the Eastern Front, prisoner-of-war camps for Wehrmacht soldiers were a significant recruitment pool for the Polish Armed Forces in the East.

Postwar
Having served in the German military or being a descendant of such individuals ("grandfather in the Wehrmacht") has led in Poland to repression, discrimination and ostracization. Even in the 21st century, such people are often seen as not being an integral part the Polish national community.

During the 2005 Polish presidential election, Donald Tusk was attacked by Law and Justice's Jacek Kurski because his grandfather had served in the Wehrmacht.

References

Military history of Poland during World War II
Military history of Germany during World War II
Polish collaborators with Nazi Germany

Further reading
- https://www.wehrmacht-polacy.pl/literatura.html - [Accessed 19/1/21] In Polish, but with many articles and books on the matter.

- https://ome-lexikon.uni-oldenburg.de/begriffe/deutsche-volksliste [Accessed 19/1/21] In German.